Juan Carlos Ferrero was the defending champion, but Alexandr Dolgopolov eliminated him in the semifinals.

Ukrainian player won this tournament. He won against Marin Čilić in the final 6–4, 3–6, 6–3 to claim the title.

Seeds
The first four seeds received a bye into the second round.

Qualifying

Draw

Finals

Top half

Bottom half

References
 Main Draw
 Qualifying Draw

ATP Studena Croatia Open - Singles
2011 Singles